William Graham Holford, Baron Holford,  (22 March 1907 – 17 October 1975) was a British architect and town planner.

Biography
Holford was educated at Diocesan College, Cape Town and returned to Johannesburg. From 1925–30 he studied architecture at the University of Liverpool, where he won the British Prix de Rome in Architecture to the British School at Rome in 1930. While in Rome he met British mural painter Marjorie Brooks, who had independently won the British Prix de Rome for Painting, and married her in 1933.

He was a lecturer at the University of Liverpool from 1933 and succeeded Patrick Abercrombie as Professor of Civic Design there in 1937. In 1948 he again succeeded Abercrombie as Professor of Town Planning at University College, London; a post he held until he retired in 1970.

Holford was knighted in 1953 and on 29 January 1965 he was made a life peer as Baron Holford, of Kemp Town in the County of Sussex by the Wilson Government, the first town planner to be made a Lord. He served as president of the Royal Town Planning Institute 1953–54, and of the Royal Institute of British Architects 1960–62.

Works
Holford was heavily involved with the development of post-World War II British town planning and was largely responsible for drafting the Town and Country Planning Act 1947.

Cambridge – the Holford-Wright Report
In 1950 Holford, along with H Myles Wright produced a report for Cambridgeshire County Council titles 'Cambridge Planning Proposals' (digitised by Cambridge City Council here). A controversial report, much of his road proposals were never completed. This included his proposal to build a ring road around Cambridge, only sections of which were ever built. These sections include Perne Road, Brooks Road and Barnwell Road. The last of the three was due to link up to Milton Road via a new road bridge over Stourbridge Common but the strength of protests prevented this from ever being built. At Cambridge Railway Station the report also proposed a new footbridge linking East Cambridge directly to the railway station, with a proposed car park and bus stop on a site off Rustat Road opposite the current station. Despite numerous calls over the decades, an eastern entrance to Cambridge railway station has never been built.

Clarendon House
Holford designed significant individual buildings, including Clarendon House in Cornmarket Street, Oxford, which was built in 1956–57 for F.W. Woolworth. Sir Nikolaus Pevsner commended Clarendon House in Oxford as one of the best recent buildings in the city's main shopping streets and showing "how this kind of job can be done tactfully and elegantly."

Eton College
Holford undertook at least three commissions for Eton College: Villiers House (under construction 1960), Farrers House (1959) and the ceiling of Eton College Chapel (1957).

Berinsfield
In 1960 Holford redesigned part of the former RAF Mount Farm, Oxfordshire to form the new village of Berinsfield. The architectural historian Jennifer Sherwood criticised Holford's plan as "an opportunity missed... little more than a huge council estate... with brick semis and terraces of the most dismal kind, sprawled out aimlessly along dreary streets..."

Piccadilly Circus
From 1961 Holford presented a series of plans to solve road traffic congestion at Piccadilly Circus, some of which included a raised piazza for pedestrians above the ground-level traffic. This concept was kept alive for the rest of 60s, before eventually being terminated by Sir Keith Joseph and Ernest Marples in 1972. The key reason given was that Holford's scheme only allowed for a 20% increase in traffic, whereas the Government wanted 50%.

Paternoster Square
Holford is particularly noted for his redevelopment plan of the area around St Paul's Cathedral in London which had been devastated by aerial bombardment in The Blitz. Only part of Holford's concept was carried out 1961–67, foremost the Paternoster Square development between St Paul's churchyard and Newgate Street. Due to the undistinguished design of the individual buildings by other architects and the omission of some of Holford's features, the new Paternoster Square soon became very unpopular. Its presence immediately north of one of the capital's prime tourist attractions was widely considered grim and an embarrassment. A redevelopment competition was launched in 1986 and after numerous changes in plans and architects, the new Paternoster Square was completed in 2003.

Brasília and Durban
Holford was a sought-after consultant outside the UK. In 1957 he was part of the committee selecting Lúcio Costa's plan for Brasília and in 1965–68 produced reports on the development of Durban in South Africa.

Canberra
In the mid-1950s the Robert Menzies Government of Australia asked Holford to report on the planning and development of Canberra, which had become disorganised due to the Great Depression, World War II and post-war economic stringency. His report led to the creation of the National Capital Development Commission (NCDC), which controlled Canberra's development 1957–89, when the city as it exists today was created. He also advised extensively on Canberra's planning and this advice was largely accepted by the NCDC and led to the evolution of Canberra into a city of car-based suburbs based on the British New Town concept. William Holford and Partners worked with English landscape architect Sylvia Crowe on the design of Commonwealth Gardens in 1964.

One unfortunate legacy is the NCDC's acceptance of his recommendation that the proposed new Parliament House be built on the banks of Lake Burley Griffin, rather than on Capital Hill. In 1978 the Parliament of Australia decided that Parliament House would be built on Capital Hill as proposed by its original planner Walter Burley Griffin. The use of the area that the Parliament House was to occupy under the Holford plan has never been fully resolved.

References

Sources and further reading

External links

 Profile on Royal Academy of Arts Collections

British urban planners
Academics of University College London
1907 births
Alumni of Diocesan College, Cape Town
1975 deaths
Recipients of the Royal Gold Medal
Presidents of the Royal Institute of British Architects
Presidents of the Royal Town Planning Institute
Prix de Rome (Britain) winners
20th-century British architects
Royal Academicians
Knights Bachelor
Life peers created by Elizabeth II